XHEOJ-FM is a radio station on 98.7 FM in Lázaro Cárdenas, Michoacán, known as Radio Centro 98.7.

History
XEOJ-AM received its concession on March 13, 1978. It was owned by Francisco Bautista Valencia and broadcast with 1 kW day and 100 watts night on 1400 kHz. Nighttime power was raised to 1 kW in the 1980s.

XEOJ received approval to migrate to FM in 2012.

In 2017, XHEOJ ditched its longtime Radio Horizonte brand for the Ke Buena grupera format—a decision that lasted a year—and went 24 hours. The change came with controversy among station employees over working hours, and a judge ordered the station to respect the preexisting work schedules of station employees where management had placed them on new overnight shifts.
In January 2019, XHEOJ rebranded as "Radio Centro 98.7".

References

Radio stations in Michoacán